Pieces of Our Past: The Sanctus Real Anthology is a comprehensive, 34-song, 3-CD set including all the songs from Sanctus Real's albums We Need Each Other, The Face of Love, and Fight the Tide. The album explores the group's growth as musicians and songwriting with songs such as "We Need Each Other", "Everything About You", and "I'm Not Alright".

Track listing

References 

2010 compilation albums
Sanctus Real albums